Elmore County Courthouse may refer to:

Elmore County Courthouse (Alabama), Wetumpka, Alabama
Elmore County Courthouse (Idaho), Mountain Home, Idaho

See also
 Elmore County (disambiguation)